Vittoria is a station of the Brescia Metro, in the city of Brescia in northern Italy. The station is in the historic core of the city, in the north-west of the Piazza della Vittoria.

Archaeological discoveries in the old city centre, and at Vittoria the buried ruins of a tower dating back to the later Middle Ages, resulted in a slowdown of the construction work in the area and some design changes.

References

External links

Brescia Metro stations
Railway stations opened in 2013
2013 establishments in Italy
Railway stations in Italy opened in the 21st century